William Nichols Cobblestone Farmhouse is a historic home located at Benton in Yates County, New York.  The farmhouse was built about 1844 and is an example of Greek Revival style, cobblestone domestic architecture. It is a -story, L-shaped residence.  It is built of reddish lakewashed cobbles. The property includes a barn and smokehouse.  The farmhouse is among the nine surviving cobblestone buildings in Yates County.

It was listed on the National Register of Historic Places in 1992.

References

Houses on the National Register of Historic Places in New York (state)
Cobblestone architecture
Greek Revival houses in New York (state)
Houses completed in 1844
Houses in Yates County, New York
National Register of Historic Places in Yates County, New York